Ziad Bakri is an Palestinian-born Palestinian actor and filmmaker. He is the son of Mohammad Bakri, brother of Saleh Bakri and Adam Bakri.

Filmography

References

External links

Living people
Israeli male film actors
Israeli male television actors
Place of birth missing (living people)
1980 births